The Copa do Brasil 2002 was the 14th staging of the Copa do Brasil. 

The competition started on February 13, 2002 and concluded on May 15, 2002 with the second leg of the final, held at the Boca do Jacaré in Taguatinga in the Federal District, in which Corinthians lifted the trophy for the second time after a 1–1 draw with Brasiliense.

Knockout round

Final phase

Champion

External links
 Copa do Brasil 2002 at RSSSF

2002 domestic association football cups
2002
2002 in Brazilian football